Tiu may refer to:
Tiu (pharaoh) (4th millennium BC), predynastic Pharaoh of Lower Egypt
Týr, as the Old English name for the Sky-God of Norse (Germanic) Mythology
Tiu, the Babylonian fiend of headache
Ţiu, a village in Cernăteşti Commune, Dolj County, Romania

a surname:
Chris Tiu, a Filipino basketball player
a variant of the Chinese family name Teoh
The Filipino version of the Chinese surname Zhang

TIU may refer to:
Richard Pearse Airport (IATA code: TIU)
Tennis Integrity Unit
Techno India University
Tishk International University
Tokyo International University
Trinity International University
Tsukuba International University